Daniel Whyte (born November 18, 1994) is a soccer player. Born in Mississauga, Ontario, he represented Guyana internationally.

Career

Club
In 2015, he joined Trinidad & Tobago club Morvant Caledonia United.

In 2016, he played in League1 Ontario with Sigma FC.

From 2017 to 2019, he played with North Mississauga SC.

In 2018, he participated in the Open Trials for the new Canadian Premier League, being one of the 56 players of the over 200 participants who were invited to the second trial.

International
In January 2015, he made contact with Faizal Khan, a national team recruiter for the Guyana national team, who gave him an opportunity to try out for the team.

He first played with the Guyana U23 team, making his debut against St Lucia U23 in a friendly, followed by participating in Olympic qualifying. Afterwards, he earned call-ups to the senior team for World Cup qualifying. In 2016, he played in a friendly with the senior squad against the Canada U23, his birth nation.

Personal
His father hails from Campbellville, Guyana. His brother, Anthony Whyte, also played for the Guyana national team.

References

External links

1994 births
Living people
Association football defenders
Sigma FC players
League1 Ontario players
North Mississauga SC players
Morvant Caledonia United players
Soccer players from Mississauga
Guyana international footballers
Guyana youth international footballers
Canadian soccer players